Ptychagnostidae is a family of agnostid trilobites from the 5th Stage to the Paibian Age of the Cambrian ( to  million years ago). The family includes several important index fossils.

Description
Like all agnostids, ptychagnostids have cephalons and pygidia that are more or less uniform in size and shape (isopygous). The thorax is composed of two body segments (somites). They are completely blind.

Distribution and age range
Ptychagnostidae has a cosmopolitan distribution. They existed during the 5th Stage of the Series 3 Epoch to the Paibian Age of the early Furongian Epoch in the Cambrian ( to  million years ago). The earliest member of the family is Ptychagnostus praecurrens from the Burgess Shale fauna.

Taxonomy
Ptychagnostidae is classified under the superfamily Agnostoidea of the suborder Agnostina, order Agnostida. The family was first established by the Japanese paleontologist Teiichi Kobayashi in 1939. Its name comes from the type genus, Ptychagnostus. It includes the following genera (with their taxonomic synonyms):
Allobodochus Opik, 1979
Criotypus Opik, 1979
Goniagnostus Howell, 1935
Lejopyge Hawle & Corda, 1847
= Miagnostus
Myrmecomimus Opik, 1979
Onymagnostus Opik, 1979
= Agnostonymus
Pseudophalacroma Pokrovskaya, 1958
Ptychagnostus Jaekel, 1909
=Triplagnostus, Huarpagnostus, Solenagnostus, Pentagnostus, Aristarius, Aotagnostus, Acidusus, Canotagnostus, Zeteagnostus
Schismagnostus Robison, 1994
Tomagnostella Kobayashi, 1939a
Tomagnostus Howell, 1935
Yakutiana Özdikmen, 2009

References

External links

Cambrian trilobites
Agnostoidea
Trilobite families
Miaolingian first appearances
Miaolingian extinctions
Paibian